War Bonnet Raceway Park was a purpose-built 2.3-mile road course located in Mannford, Oklahoma, which played host to a single Trans-Am Series event in 1968, two open-wheel SCCA F5000 event in 1967 and 1968, as well as various sports car races organized by the SCCA between 1967 and 1970.

Lap Records
The fastest official race lap records at War Bonnet Raceway Park are listed as:

References

Motorsport venues in Oklahoma
Defunct motorsport venues in the United States
Defunct sports venues in Oklahoma
Sports venues completed in 1967